Noel Fielding (born 21 May 1973) is an English actor and comedian. He is best known for his work with The Mighty Boosh comedy troupe alongside Julian Barratt in the 2000s, and more recently as a co-presenter of The Great British Bake Off since 2017. He is known for his dark and surreal comedic style.

In the 1990s, Fielding began performing stand-up comedy and met Barratt on the comedy circuit. Together, they produced a 2001 radio series called The Boosh for BBC Radio London. This was followed by the television show The Mighty Boosh, which ran for three series on BBC Three from 2004 to 2007. The show generated a cult following and won a variety of awards.

During the 2000s, Fielding also had smaller roles in a number of comedy shows for Channel 4 including Nathan Barley, The IT Crowd, AD/BC: A Rock Opera, and Garth Marenghi's Darkplace. After The Mighty Boosh, he wrote and starred in two series of a solo show for Channel 4 called Noel Fielding's Luxury Comedy, which ran between 2012 and 2014. He also appeared as himself as a team captain on the BBC Two comedy panel show Never Mind the Buzzcocks from 2009 to 2015 and as a guest on Richard Ayoade's Travel Man series.

Fielding has also exhibited his paintings in London and collaborated with Fendi for their autumn/winter 2021 menswear collection. He is the founder of the band Loose Tapestries, which he formed with Kasabian guitarist Sergio Pizzorno.

Early life
Fielding was born in the Westminster area of London on 21 May 1973, the son of Royal Mail manager Ray Fielding (born 1953) and Yvonne Fagan (1953–1990), and grew up in Pollards Hill near Croydon. He is of French descent through his grandmother. His parents separated some time after he was born. His comedic partner Julian Barratt described Fielding’s upbringing as “feral”; according to an article in The Sunday Times, Fielding's parents "had lots of parties" during his childhood, and Fielding has described how they would party through the night and that he would have to step over the bodies of their sleeping friends in the mornings as he got up. When Fielding was three years old, his father remarried, and Fielding was mostly raised by his grandmother. He describes his grandmother as someone he had a lot of respect for, saying in 2011 to The Guardian, “My grandma is really strong. I like strong women. That's what I respond to." His father and stepmother Diane would later become more involved in parenting during Fielding’s mother’s illness in the 1980s. His mother had two more children before dying in 1990 aged 37 years old, from complications caused by liver damage. His younger paternal half-brother, Michael, later played various characters in Fielding's television comedy shows, and his father and stepmother would also appear. Ray Fielding had several cameos as a Chris de Burgh on The Mighty Boosh.

Fielding was educated at Croydon School of Art, then studied for a BA in Graphic Design and Advertising at Buckinghamshire New University, then called Buckinghamshire Chilterns University College in High Wycombe, where he lived with friends and future collaborators Dave Brown and Nigel Coan. He graduated in 1995.

Career

Stand-up comedy
In 2010, Fielding was supposed to perform a solo tour across the country. It was cancelled, however, so he could concentrate on writing The Mighty Boosh film with Julian Barratt and creating an album. Fielding announced via Twitter that he was too busy to do the tour. In 2015, he told The Guardian that the film was something he talked about writing with Barratt. His album was released in June 2016. In 2010 and 2014, he took part in Channel 4's Comedy Gala, a benefit show held in aid of Great Ormond Street Children's Hospital.

The Mighty Boosh

The Mighty Boosh has won the Shockwaves NME Best TV Award three times: in 2007, 2008, and 2010.

Television

At Bill Bailey's request, Fielding stood in as a team captain for three episodes during series 21 of Never Mind the Buzzcocks. He also achieved a record for the highest team score ever on the show. When Bailey returned, presenter Simon Amstell made various jokes about Fielding's departure. In 2009, Bailey left the show and Fielding became one of the regular team captains. According to Neil Gaiman's blog, Fielding was scheduled to appear in the film Stardust, but had to drop out due to ill health. He also participated twice with Russell Brand in 2006 and 2007 on the annual quiz show The Big Fat Quiz of the Year. He participated again in 2010, 2013, 2017, 2018 and 2019, with Richard Ayoade.

In 2011, he took part in Catherine Tate's TV movie Laughing at the Noughties in which he and other British comedians discussed the comedy highlights of the noughties.

Fielding produced his first solo series for Channel 4 network's E4 channel in 2011, as the broadcaster invested an additional £5 million in its comedy budget following the cancellation of reality show Big Brother. Fielding said of the project, tentatively titled Noel Fielding: Boopus: "I want to make something in the spirit of Spike Milligan or the Kenny Everett Show but using modern techniques. Blending filmed comedy with animation. Television needs a madman! I want the show to be psychedelic and beautiful but have charm and personality. If Dalí made a show hopefully it would look like this." The show began broadcasting in January 2012, titled Noel Fielding's Luxury Comedy. The show's second series, titled Noel Fielding's Luxury Comedy 2: Tales From Painted Hawaii, was first broadcast on E4 in 2014.

Also in 2011, Fielding performed Kate Bush's "Wuthering Heights" dance routine for Series 3 of Let's Dance For Comic Relief, and reached the grand final.

In March 2017 it was revealed that Fielding would co-host the upcoming series of The Great British Bake Off alongside Sandi Toksvig.

Fielding appeared as a contestant on Series 4 of the Dave comedy panel game Taskmaster in 2017, hosted by Greg Davies and Alex Horne: he was the overall series winner.

In January 2018, he was a panellist on QI alongside Russell Brand and Aisling Bea.

In 2022, Fielding will play as Dick Turpin in an upcoming Apple TV+ comedy series.

Radio
In November 2007, Fielding starred in five episodes of BBC Radio 2 show Vic Reeves' House Arrest as a local vagrant who knocks on Reeves' door once a week to ask for work.

Music
Fielding has appeared in several music videos, including Mint Royale's "Blue Song", alongside Julian Barratt, Nick Frost and Michael Smiley. The video was directed by Edgar Wright and served as the inspiration for the opening sequence of his film Baby Driver (2017). He also made a brief appearance in the video for Razorlight's "In the Morning". He appeared in music videos for the Robots in Disguise songs "Girl" (alongside Chris Corner who was, at the time, boyfriend to Sue Denim), "The Tears", and "Turn It Up". In 2009, Noel was involved in the Kasabian video "Vlad the Impaler", in which he plays the titular character, and reprised the role at the 2014 Glastonbury Festival. The music video was directed by Richard Ayoade. He was referenced in Kasabian's "La Fée Verte", a track on their Velociraptor! album (his friend Sergio Pizzorno said "The line, 'I met Dalí in the street.' Dalí is Noel Fielding. And he is the modern-day Dalí"). Fielding also makes a brief appearance as Vlad in the video for another Kasabian song, "Re-Wired", riding a five-seater bicycle with the band, and appears as a patient in a psychiatric hospital in "You're In Love With a Psycho", in which he re-enacts the broken mirror routine from the Marx Brothers film Duck Soup with Pizzorno and Tom Meighan. He has also appeared in Kate Bush's music video "Deeper Understanding" as a means of thanks for the Let's Dance For Comic Relief performance.

Art

He held his first exhibition, entitled Psychedelic Dreams of the Jelly Fox, at Maison Bertaux, a patisserie in Greek Street, Soho in early 2008. There Fielding listed some of his inspirations as Henri Rousseau, René Magritte, Willem de Kooning, Roy Lichtenstein, and Dexter Dalwood. He has stated that he has been heavily influenced by the works of Salvador Dalí. A second exhibition entitled Bryan Ferry vs the Jelly Fox took place at Maison Bertaux, from 5 July 2010 through to 5 January 2011.

On 6 September 2011, Fielding received an honorary master's degree from Buckinghamshire New University for his ongoing interest in the graphics area and support for many art organisations.

In October 2011, Fielding released an art book called Scribblings of a Madcap Shambleton, which he produced along with The Mighty Boosh cast member Dave Brown. It features many of his old and new paintings, drawings and photography.

Fielding's video installation of The Jelly Fox was shown at the Saatchi Gallery, and in 2012 he created a unique piece inspired by The Beatles for Liverpool Love at the Museum of Liverpool. In March 2015, his exhibition He Wore Dreams Around Unkind Faces was shown at the Royal Albert Hall. In January 2021, the luxury fashion house Fendi unveiled a collection featuring abstract takes on the brand's logo, created by Fielding.

Personal life
Fielding was formerly in a relationship with Robots in Disguise lead vocalist Dee Plume, who made minor appearances in The Mighty Boosh and in its live adaptations. He began dating radio DJ Lliana Bird sometime around 2010. They reside in the Highgate area of London. Their first child, a daughter named Dali (after artist Salvador Dalí), was born in 2018. The couple's second daughter, Iggy, was born in August 2020.

In 2009, a Sunday Times article revealed that Fielding had contracted hepatitis during his college years; he said that he was helped through this time by his friend and collaborator Nigel Coan. This forced him not to drink alcohol for six months, which led him to become teetotal for a couple of years. He said, "I used to be able to enjoy myself with just nothing. I'd stay up till four in the morning, with everyone else being drunk. Just make a bit of effort and you can get used to it."

Fielding was named one of GQs 50 best dressed British men in 2015.

Filmography

Film

Television

Music videos

References

External links

Official website

PBJ Artist Page

1973 births
Living people
20th-century English comedians
20th-century English male actors
21st-century English comedians
21st-century English male actors
Alumni of Buckinghamshire New University
Alumni of Croydon College
British surrealist artists
Comedians from London
English comedy writers
English male comedians
English male film actors
English male stage actors
English male television actors
English people of French descent
English satirists
English writers
NME Awards winners
People from Westminster